Soviet Wings may refer to:

Krylya Sovetov Moscow, ice hockey club that competes in the Russian VHL
MHC Krylya Sovetov, former ice hockey club that competed in the Russian VHL and MHL
Soviet Wings Sport Palace, home of the two above teams, in Moscow, Russia.
Soviet Wings (IHL), touring Russian ice hockey club that played in the International Hockey League for one season
 USC Soviet Wings, universal sports hall, it can also be used to host boxing matches, in Moscow, Russia.